The 1949/50 NTFL season was the 29th season of the Northern Territory Football League (NTFL).

Buffaloes have won their 10th premiership title while defeating the Wanderers in the grand final by 54 points.

Grand Final

References 

Northern Territory Football League seasons
NTFL